KCMB (104.7 FM) is a radio station licensed to serve Baker City, Oregon, United States. The station is owned by the Elkhorn Media Group and the broadcast license is held by KCMB, LLC.

Programming
KCMB broadcasts a country music format that includes some programming from Citadel Media.

History
This station received its original construction permit from the Federal Communications Commission on April 28, 1986.  The new station was assigned the KCMB call sign by the FCC on October 3, 1986.  After multiple extensions, KCMB received its license to cover from the FCC on January 10, 1989.

In December 1989, Clare Marie Ferguson-Capps reached an agreement to transfer the license for this station to Oregon Trail Radio, Inc.  The deal was approved by the FCC on February 1, 1990.

Effective August 28, 2012, Capps sold the station to KCMB, LLC for $1.25 million.

References

External links
KCMB official website

CMB
Country radio stations in the United States
Baker City, Oregon
Radio stations established in 1986
1986 establishments in Oregon